Impacto De Fe is a nondenominational Hispanic church located in Commerce City, Colorado.

History
Impacto de fe was founded in 2001 in Arvada Colorado as the Hispanic ministry of Faith Bible Chapel International.

Ministries

Impacto Kids
Impacto Kids is the children's ministry of Impacto de Fe. The church provides a children's program for all weekend and weekday services.

Impacto Youth

Impacto Youth is the youth ministry at Impacto de Fe. The ministry serves youth between the ages of 13 and 25, meeting once a week.

Oasis Food Bank
Oasis Food Bank is the church's local food bank which provides food for the surrounding community and neighborhoods around Commerce City. The food bank is open once a week on Saturday mornings.

Affiliated Churches
Impacto De Fe also has sister churches in two locations, Colorado Springs, Colorado and Fort Collins, Colorado

Impacto de Fe Colorado Springs

Impacto de Fe Fort Collins

References

Non-denominational Evangelical churches
Evangelical megachurches in the United States
Megachurches in Colorado